The Montague Arms was a music venue located at 289 Queens Road, in the Telegraph Hill ward of Lewisham, on the borders of Peckham and New Cross in south-east London from 1967 until 2018. The pub venue was known for its eccentric decor; which included old fishing-boat lights, a 19th Century carriage containing a stuffed zebra, and an old diving suit.

History
A pub with this name had been situated on Queen's Road since at least 1868. The Montague Arms was owned by Peter Hoyle from 1967, and managed by Stan and Bet Pownall who ran it until their deaths in 2012. The pub reopened in 2014 under the ownership of Noel Gale.

Whilst in charge Hoyle regularly performed, along with Peter London, as The Two Petes. They covered popular rock and pop songs with London on keyboards and vocals and Hoyle on drums. The duo put out a series of albums recorded live at the venue in the 1970s.

It once bore a sign reading 'Tourists Welcome, Coaches Welcome' as, before the launch of the Eurostar and availability of cheap flights to mainland Europe, it was a regular stopping point for those headed to the ferry at Dover.

In the 1970s, as well as live music, the pub also hosted live comedy. Mike Reid and Jim Davidson performed there early in their careers.

The pub was the location of a round table interview with Nick Cave, Mark E Smith, and Shane MacGowan published in the NME in 1989. The trio also took part in an impromptu jam session on the pub's small stage with Cave on organ, Smith on guitar and MacGowan on drums.

In January 2018 the current managers were forced to make some of the pub’s eight bar staff redundant and cancel upcoming gigs at short notice after they were informed that the pub had been sold. A Change.org petition was set up imploring the new owners to keep the venue as a live music venue which received over 9,000 signatures.

For its last three years it was the venue for an independently run LGBTQ+ friendly clubnight called Passionate Necking, as well as a monthly DIY comedy cabaret, Piñata.

In May 2018 the premises was reopened solely as a pub under new management with a "minimalist" aesthetic.
 
Despite the community's expectation that it was going to relaunch as a gastropub following the demolition of its iconic stage, the pub concentrated instead on cocktails and games, such as shuffleboard and table football. The pub failed to draw in enough custom and shut its doors again in July 2019.

The building is still unused, and any possibility of returning it to being a venue was temporarily under threat in early 2021 when a proposal was submitted to knock it down, replacing it with flats and a much smaller pub which would most likely be prohibited from hosting live music. After a flurry of objections from the public, a letter signed jointly by Telegraph Hill ward councillors Paul Bell, Joan Millbank and Luke Sorba was published voicing their own disagreement with the plans.

Artists to play The Montague Arms
Apologies, I Have None
Anna Calvi
Band of Holy Joy
Big Joanie
Caribou
Colour Me Wednesday 
Crywank
Dream Nails 
Doe
The Ethical Debating Society 
Feature
Fresh
Gang of Four
Gnarwolves 
Great Cynics
Hatcham Social (as The Crowd)
Happy Accidents
Iron Chic 
Johnny Foreigner
King Krule
Me Rex
Muncie Girls
Pardon Us
Sauna Youth
Shopping
Skinny Girl Diet
The Smith Street Band
The Spook School
RVIVR
The Violets
Witching Waves
Wolf Girl

References

Music venues in London
Nightclubs in London
Defunct nightclubs in the United Kingdom
Underground punk scene in the United Kingdom
Pubs in the London Borough of Lewisham
Former pubs in London